Mariah may refer to:

Mariah (given name), including a list of people with the name
Mariah (microprocessor), a VAX microprocessor designed by Digital Equipment Corporation
Another name for the fish commonly known as burbot

See also
Maria (disambiguation)
Mariah's Storm, an American Thoroughbred racehorse